An empty element may be: 

 An empty HTML element, one with tag(s) but no content (HTML element § Empty element)
 An empty XML element, one with tag(s) but no content (XML § Key terminology)
 An empty SGML element, one with tag(s) but no content (Standard Generalized Markup Language § EMPTY).

See also
 Well-formed element